Polyopisthocotylea is a subclass of parasitic flatworms in the class Monogenea.

Classification
There are only two subclasses in the class Monogenea:
 Monopisthocotylea. The name means "a single posterior sucker" - the attachment organ (the haptor) is simple. 
 Polyopisthocotylea. The name means "several posterior suckers" - the attachment organ (the haptor) is complex, with several clamps or suckers. 

The subclass Polyopisthocotylea contains the four following orders:
 Order Chimaericolidea
 Order Diclybothriidea
 Order Mazocraeidea
 Order Polystomatidea

Examples of species

 Microcotyle visa, one of the numerous species which are parasitic on gills of marine fish.
Diplozoon paradoxum, famous for its perfect monogamy, with the two individuals of the pair fused together
Lethacotyle vera, a parasite of the brassy trevally (Caranx papuensis), "the monogenean which lost its clamps"
Polystoma integerrimum, a parasite of frogs which synchronises its breeding with that of its host
Protocotyle euzetmaillardi, a parasite of the bigeyed sixgill shark Hexanchus nakamurai
 Chimaericola leptogaster, a parasite of the gills of the chimaera Chimaera monstrosa.

References

External links

 
Protostome subclasses